"Hearts on Fire" is a song co-written and recorded by American country music artist Eddie Rabbitt.  It was released in February 1978 as the first single from the album Variations.  The song reached number 2 on the Billboard Hot Country Singles & Tracks chart.  It was written by Rabbitt, Dan Tyler and Even Stevens.

Chart performance

References

1978 singles
Eddie Rabbitt songs
Songs written by Eddie Rabbitt
Songs written by Even Stevens (songwriter)
Song recordings produced by David Malloy
Elektra Records singles
1978 songs
Songs written by Dan Tyler